Marcus Maye (born March 9, 1993) is an American football free safety for the New Orleans Saints of the National Football League (NFL). He previously played for the New York Jets. He played college football at Florida. Maye is a native of Melbourne, Florida. Maye has been praised for his versatility and was selected first-team All-American by USA Today.

Early years
Maye attended and played high school football at Holy Trinity Episcopal Academy.

College career
Maye played college football at the University of Florida. He redshirted in 2012. As a freshman in 2013, he played in 8 games, making 16 tackles and an interception. As a sophomore in 2014, he played 11 games with 62 tackles, 5 passes defended, 2 forced fumbles, and an interception. As a junior in 2015, Maye played 12 games with 77 tackles, 4 passes defended, 2 forced fumbles, and 2 interceptions. As a senior in 2016, he played 9 games with 50 tackles, a sack, and an interception.

Collegiate statistics

Professional career
Maye received an invitation to the NFL Combine, but opted to not perform drills and wait until his pro day. At Florida's Pro Day, he chose to perform all of the combine drills except the bench press and completed positional drills for team representatives and scouts. NFL draft experts and analysts projected him to be a second round draft pick. He was ranked as the fourth best free safety in the draft by NFLDraftScout.com, was ranked the seventh best safety by ESPN, and the eighth best safety by Sports Illustrated.

New York Jets
The New York Jets selected Maye in the second round (39th overall) of the 2017 NFL Draft. He was the second safety selected by the Jets after they selected LSU's Jamal Adams sixth overall.

2017
On May 23, 2017, the New York Jets signed Maye to a four-year, $6.55 million contract with $3.66 million guaranteed and a signing bonus of $2.90 million.

He entered training camp competing against Jamal Adams and Calvin Pryor to be one of the starting safeties. Head coach Todd Bowles named Maye the starting free safety to begin the regular season, alongside strong safety Jamal Adams.

He made his professional regular season debut and first career start in the New York Jets' season-opener at the Buffalo Bills and recorded seven combined tackles during a 21–12 loss. In Week 5, Maye recorded four combined tackles, deflected a pass, and made his first career interception off a pass by quarterback Kevin Hogan in the Jets' 17–14 victory at the Cleveland Browns. On October 22, 2017, he collected a season-high seven combined tackles, broke up a pass, and intercepted a pass attempt by Jay Cutler in the Jets' 31–28 loss at the Miami Dolphins. In Week 15, Maye made a season-high tying seven combined tackles during a 31–19 loss at the New Orleans Saints.

2018
Maye missed the first three games of 2018 due to a foot injury, but returned in Week 4 as the Jets starting free safety. During Week 5 against the Denver Broncos, Maye intercepted Case Keenum and returned it 104 yards but was a yard shy of scoring a touchdown. Time expired anyhow and the Jets won 34–16. The interception set the NFL record for longest interception return without scoring a touchdown. He then suffered a broken thumb the following week against the Indianapolis Colts and missed the next game. He returned in Week 8, playing in the next three games before suffering a shoulder injury in Week 10 against the Buffalo Bills. He was placed on injured reserve on December 1, 2018, ending an injury-plagued season for Maye.

2019

Maye changed his number from 26 to 20 to accommodate the signing of Le'Veon Bell. In week 16 against the Pittsburgh Steelers, Maye recorded an interception off a pass thrown by Devlin Hodges late in the fourth quarter to seal a 16–10 Jets' win.  This was Maye's first interception of the season.

2020
During Week 1 against the Buffalo Bills, Maye recorded a team high 10 tackles, two sacks, two quarterback hits, two tackles for loss, two passes defensed, and one forced fumble as the Jets lost 17–27. In Week 6 against the Miami Dolphins, Maye recorded his first interception of the season off a pass thrown by Ryan Fitzpatrick by placing the ball between his hand and his backside during the 24–0 loss. In Week 11 against the Los Angeles Chargers, Maye forced a fumble on wide receiver Keenan Allen at the goal line which was recovered by teammate Ashtyn Davis during the 34–28 loss.

2021
The Jets placed the franchise tag on Maye on March 9, 2021. He signed the one-year tender on March 22, 2021. On November 9, 2021, Maye was placed on injured reserve after suffering a torn Achilles in Week 9.

New Orleans Saints

2022
On March 16, 2022, the New Orleans Saints signed Maye to a three-year, $28.5 million contract.

NFL career statistics

Regular season

Legal issues
On October 4, 2021, it was announced that Maye was facing charges in a DUI arrest and car crash that occurred back in February 2021.

On September 1, 2022, Maye was arrested for aggravated assault with a firearm and was booked into Jefferson Parish Correctional Center in Louisiana. He was released from jail after posting a $30,000 bond. The incident occurred due to a road rage event in which Maye was alleged to have charged the victims car naked. Cops say Maye was driving a black SUV when he was accused of pointing a gun at a car full of "several juvenile females." Local bystanders were able to
subdue Maye until officers responded.

References

External links
 Florida Gators profile
 New York Jets profile

1993 births
Living people
All-American college football players
American football safeties
Florida Gators football players
Holy Trinity Episcopal Academy alumni
New Orleans Saints players
New York Jets players
People from Melbourne, Florida
Players of American football from Florida